The Glenbrook is a , Mogul type, narrow-gauge steam railway locomotive built by Baldwin Locomotive Works in 1875 for the Carson and Tahoe Lumber and Fluming Company's  narrow-gauge railroad.

History
The Glenbrook and its sister, #3, The Tahoe were built to haul cordwood and lumber from Glenbrook, Nevada on the east shore of Lake Tahoe to Spooner Summit, at the crest of the Carson Range. At the summit, the logs and lumber were put in a flume which carried it to the south end of Carson City. There it was loaded onto flatcars of the Virginia & Truckee Railroad which carried it to Virginia City for use in construction of the town, as mine timbers, and as boiler fuel.

The area was fairly well logged out by 1890 and the Bliss family, the owners sold The Tahoe to the Nevada County Narrow Gauge Railroad (NCNG). In 1899, they took up the two lines and moved all of the equipment and rails to Tahoe City, California, on the northwest shore of the lake. The new line, the Lake Tahoe Railway and Transportation (LTR&T) carried freight and passengers and connected with the  lake steamer SS Tahoe. The Bliss family sold the LTR&T to the Southern Pacific in 1926. The larger road immediately converted its new branch to standard gauge.

The Bliss family had kept #1 out of the sale and stored it at Tahoe City until 1937 when they sold it to the Nevada County Narrow Gauge, which used it largely for parts for Tahoe. The NCNG shut down in 1942, but Hope Bliss convinced her family to buy the locomotive back from the NCNG and presented it to the Nevada State Museum and to the Nevada State Railroad Museum where it underwent major work. It was announced that it would go back into service in May 2015 and was unveiled to the public on 23 May 2015.

In 2021, The Glenbrook visited the Cumbres and Toltec Scenic Railroad for their Victorian Iron Horse Round Up Celebration with the Eureka locomotive.

The Glenbrook was added to the National Register of Historic Places in 1981.

References

National Register of Historic Places in Carson City, Nevada
Baldwin locomotives
2-6-0 locomotives
Railway locomotives on the National Register of Historic Places in Nevada
Individual locomotives of the United States
Narrow gauge steam locomotives of the United States
3 ft gauge locomotives
Preserved steam locomotives of Nevada